Eden Park is a suburban area in Greater London, England, within the London Borough of Bromley, Greater London and prior to 1965, in the historic county of Kent. It lies south of Beckenham, west of Park Langley and Shortlands, north of West Wickham and Monks Orchard and east of Elmers End.

History
The area was traditionally rural; William Eden leased land here in the 1780s and developed the area as farmland. Large mansions began to be constructed in the area in the 19th century, increasing after the opening of Eden Park station in 1882 and then especially rapidly after the First World War. Many of the older mansions were destroyed and replaced with the suburban housing that now characterises the area.

From 1994 to 2004 the area was home to a large skating park; this was closed by Bromley Council following complaints about noise.

Amenities
The area contains a row of shops by the railway station, and another row in the area formerly known as Upper Elmers End, as well as a few restaurants including a Toby Carvery pub, built in 1936 as a hotel.

The main parks in the area are Crease Park, named after local Alderman James Crease and opened in July 1936, Stanhope Recreation Ground on Stanhope Grove and Harvington Sports Ground (also known as Harvington Estate) on Eden Park Avenue.

Transport
Eden Park railway station serves the area with services to London Charing Cross, London Cannon Street and Hayes. Eden Park is served by three Transport for London buses. The 194 to Lower Sydenham via Beckenham and to West Croydon via Shirley, the 356 to Upper Sydenham via Elmers End and to Shirley, and the 358 to Crystal Palace via Beckenham and to Orpington via Bromley.

Education 

Langley Park Primary School
Langley Park School for Boys
Langley Park School for Girls
Marian Vian Primary School
Eden Park High School
Unicorn Primary School

Sports 
The Parklangley Club
Club Langley
Beckenham Town Football Club

Gallery

References

External links 
 St John's Church 
Historical images of Eden Park



Areas of London
Districts of the London Borough of Bromley